Dorcadion brannani is a species of beetle in the family Cerambycidae. It was described by Schaufuss in 1870. It is known from Portugal and Spain.

See also 
Dorcadion

References

brannani
Beetles described in 1870